The Las Vegas–Henderson combined statistical area, known prior to 2013 as the Las Vegas–Paradise–Pahrump combined statistical area, is made up of two counties in southern Nevada and one in northwestern Arizona. The statistical area consists of the Las Vegas–Paradise, NV MSA, the Lake Havasu City–Kingman, AZ MSA and the Pahrump micropolitan statistical area.  At the 2010 census, the CSA had a population of 2,195,401.

Counties
Clark County, Nevada
Mohave County, Arizona
Nye County, Nevada

Communities

Incorporated places
Boulder City, Nevada
Bullhead City, Arizona
Henderson, Nevada (Principal city)
Kingman, Arizona
Lake Havasu City, Arizona
Las Vegas, Nevada (Principal city)
North Las Vegas, Nevada
Mesquite, Nevada

Census-designated places
Note: All census-designated places are unincorporated.

Arizona Village, Arizona
Beatty, Nevada
Blue Diamond, Nevada
Bunkerville, Nevada
Cal-Nev-Ari, Nevada
Desert Hills, Arizona
Dolan Springs, Arizona
Enterprise, Nevada
Fort Mohave, Arizona
Goodsprings, Nevada
Indian Springs, Nevada
Kaibab, Arizona (part)
Laughlin, Nevada
Littlefield, Arizona
Mesquite Creek, Arizona
Moapa Town, Nevada
Moapa Valley, Nevada
Mohave Valley, Arizona
Mojave Ranch Estates, Arizona
Mount Charleston, Nevada
Mountain's Edge, Nevada
New Kingman-Butler, Arizona
Pahrump (Principal city)
Paradise, Nevada
Peach Springs, Arizona
Sandy Valley, Nevada
Scenic, Arizona
Searchlight, Nevada
Spring Valley, Nevada
Summerlin South, Nevada
Sunrise Manor, Nevada
Tonopah, Nevada
Whitney, Nevada
Willow Valley, Arizona
Winchester, Nevada

Unincorporated places

Amargosa Valley, Nevada
Arden, Nevada
Beaver Dam, Arizona
Cactus Springs, Clark County, Nevada
Carvers, Nevada
Chloride, Arizona
Cottonwood Cove, Nevada
Crystal, Clark County, Nevada
Crystal, Nye County, Nevada
Currant
Duckwater, Nevada
Gabbs, Nevada
Glendale, Nevada
Golden Valley, Arizona
Hackberry, Arizona
Hadley, Nevada
Jean, Nevada
Lockes, Nevada
Logandale, Nevada
Manhattan, Nevada
Meadview, Arizona
Mercury, Nevada
Mountain Springs, Nevada
Nelson, Nevada
Nothing, Arizona
Oatman, Arizona
Overton, Nevada
Primm, Nevada
Round Mountain, Nevada
Scotty's Junction, Nevada
Sloan, Nevada
Sunnyside, Nevada
Topock, Arizona
Valentine, Arizona
Wikieup, Arizona
Yomba, Nevada
Yucca, Arizona

See also
Nevada census statistical areas
Arizona census statistical areas
List of cities in Nevada
List of cities in Arizona

References

Populated places in Clark County, Nevada
Populated places in Nye County, Nevada
Populated places in Mohave County, Arizona
Combined statistical areas of the United States